Ollie Rue O'Sullivan (born 1972) is an Irish Gaelic football selector and former player. At club level he played with Garnish and Beara and was also a member of the Cork senior football team. O'Sullivan lined out as both a defender and a forward.

Playing career

O'Sullivan began his Gaelic football career at juvenile and underage levels with Garnish, before winning several Beara Junior Championship titles with the club's top adult team. His success at divisional level saw him drafted onto the Beara divisional team and he captained the team to the Cork Senior Football Championship title in 1997. O'Sullivan first appeared on the inter-county scene during a two-year stint with the Cork minor team before later lining out with the under-21 side. He was a two-time All-Ireland Junior Football Championship winner with the Cork junior team and spent a number of seasons with the Cork senior football team.

Coaching career

O'Sullivan served as a selector with the Cork minor football team during Bobbie O'Dwyer's tenure as manager. In 2019, he was part of the management team that secured the All-Ireland Minor Football Championship title after a win over Galway

Honours

Player

Beara
Cork Senior Football Championship: 1997 (c)

Cork
All-Ireland Junior Football Championship: 1993, 1996
Munster Junior Football Championship: 1993, 1996

Management

Cork
All-Ireland Minor Football Championship: 2019

References

1972 births
Living people
Garnish Gaelic footballers
Beara Gaelic footballers
Cork inter-county Gaelic footballers
Gaelic football selectors